The 2018 Open BNP Paribas Banque de Bretagne was a professional tennis tournament played on hard courts. It was the eighth edition of the tournament which was part of the 2018 ATP Challenger Tour. It took place in Quimper, France between 29 January and 4 February 2018.

Singles main-draw entrants

Seeds

1 Rankings as of January 15, 2018.

Other entrants
The following players received wildcards into the singles main draw:
  Elliot Benchetrit
  Evan Furness
  Stefanos Tsitsipas

The following player received entry into the singles main draw as a special exempt:
  Antoine Hoang

The following player received entry into the singles main draw as an alternate:
  Jay Clarke

The following players received entry from the qualifying draw:
  Grégoire Barrère
  Matteo Donati
  David Guez
  Maxime Janvier

The following players received entry as lucky losers:
  Jeremy Jahn
  Tristan Lamasine

Champions

Singles

 Quentin Halys def.  Alexey Vatutin 6–3, 7–6(7–1).

Doubles

 Ken Skupski /  Neal Skupski def.  Sander Gillé /  Joran Vliegen 6–3, 3–6, [10–7].

External links
Official Website

2018 ATP Challenger Tour
2018
2018 in French tennis